Richmond Coka Nsiah (born 2 December 2003) is a Ghanaian professional footballer who plays as defender for Ghanaian Premier League side Bechem United F.C.

Career 
Nsiah started his professional career with Bechem United and was promoted to the senior team ahead of the 2019–20 season.  He made his debut on 8 March 2020, after coming on in the 64th minute for Augustine Randolf in a goalless draw against Dreams FC. That was his only appearance that season as the league was cut short as a result of the COVID-19 pandemic in Ghana.

References

External links 

 
 

Living people
2003 births
Association football defenders
Ghanaian footballers
Bechem United F.C. players
Ghana Premier League players